In computer science (specifically computational complexity theory), the worst-case complexity  (It is denoted by Big-oh(n) ) measures the resources (e.g. running time, memory) that an algorithm requires given an input of arbitrary size (commonly denoted as  in asymptotic notation). It gives an upper bound on the resources required by the algorithm.

In the case of running time, the worst-case time complexity indicates the longest running time performed by an algorithm given any input of size , and thus guarantees that the algorithm will finish in the indicated period of time. The order of growth (e.g. linear, logarithmic) of the worst-case complexity is commonly used to compare the efficiency of two algorithms.

The worst-case complexity of an algorithm should be contrasted with its average-case complexity, which is an average measure of the amount of resources the algorithm uses on a random input.

Definition 
Given a model of computation and an algorithm  that halts on each input , the mapping  is called the time complexity of  if, for every input string ,  halts after exactly  steps.

Since we usually are interested in the dependence of the time complexity on different input lengths, abusing terminology, the time complexity is sometimes referred to the mapping , defined by the maximal complexity

of inputs  with length or size .

Similar definitions can be given for space complexity, randomness complexity, etc.

Ways of speaking
Very frequently, the complexity  of an algorithm  is given in asymptotic Big-O Notation, which gives its growth rate in the form  with a certain real valued comparison function  and the meaning:
 There exists a positive real number  and a natural number  such that

Quite frequently, the wording is:
 „Algorithm  has the worst-case complexity .“
or even only:
 „Algorithm  has complexity .“

Examples 
Consider performing insertion sort on  numbers on a random access machine. The best-case for the algorithm is when the numbers are already sorted, which takes  steps to perform the task.

See also 
 Analysis of algorithms

References 
 Thomas H. Cormen, Charles E. Leiserson, Ronald L. Rivest, and Clifford Stein. Introduction to Algorithms, Second Edition. MIT Press and McGraw-Hill, 2001. . Chapter 2.2: Analyzing algorithms, pp.25-27.
 Oded Goldreich. Computational Complexity: A Conceptual Perspective. Cambridge University Press, 2008. , p.32.

Analysis of algorithms